Baba Mastnath University, Rohtak, a private self – financing University, blossomed under the aegis of Shri Baba Mastnath Math, Asthal Bohar in 2012 under Haryana Private Universities Act 2006. BMU situated in Rohtak Campus on Delhi-Rohtak National Highway 10. BMU has achieved significant academic growth and development in the field of professional and health sciences education over the last one decade. Guided by well-defined, clearly articulated Vision, Mission and Goals the BMU is the all- inclusive platform for diverse fields of career such as B.A.M.S, pharmacy, management, law, engineering, science, humanities, commerce, nursing and much more. Organizational values of transparency, participative management and decentralization are reflected in internal quality assurance efforts, modernization of the examination system, regular meetings of the heads of department and various statutory and non-statutory bodies. University has introduced an Annual Quality Assurance Exercise attesting to the pursuit of quality in all aspects at all times. In keeping with global trends in higher education, university imparts to all students a globally relevant and locally applicable curriculum of international standard. Outcome and Skill based training is achieved through the Clinical Skill Labs, Cadaveric Skill Labs, an active Medical Education Training Unit, adoption of the latest pedagogy and assessment methods.

Faculties at BMU 

 Faculty of Ayurveda
 Faculty of Physiotherapy
 Faculty of Nursing
 Faculty of Sciences
 Faculty of Pharmacy
 Faculty of Humanities
 Faculty of Commerce & Management
 Faculty of Law
 Faculty of Engineering
 Faculty of Education

Academics
BMU offers Under Graduate, Post Graduate and Doctoral Programmes in Ayurveda (B.A.M.S), Physiotherapy, Nursing, Sciences, Pharmacy, Humanities, Management & Commerce, Law, Naturopathy & Yogic Sciences, Engineering, Education, Mass Media, Computer Sciences, Languages like Hindi, Sanskrit and English, Social Work, Medical and Para-Medical, Pharmacy, Life and Basic Sciences.

Accreditation
Baba Mastnath University is UGC approved University. It has been established and set up under the Haryana Private Universities Act, 2006.

References

External links
 

Private universities in India
Baba Mastnath University
Education in Rohtak
Educational institutions established in 2012
2012 establishments in Haryana